Jyotiranjan Srichandan Ray (born 1970) is an Indian geochemist, geochronologist and a professor at the Physical Research Laboratory. He is known for his studies on the geochronology of the Indian subcontinent and his studies have been documented in several peer-reviewed articles; ResearchGate and Google Scholar, online repositories of scientific articles, have listed 53 and 59 of them respectively. He has authored a book, Vindhyan Geology: Status and Perspectives, published in 2006 by the Indian Academy of Sciences and has also contributed chapters to books published by others.

Ray, born on 16 July 1970, in the Indian state of Odisha, is a recipient of several honors including Best PhD Thesis Award of the Physical Research Laboratory, Young Associateship of the Indian Academy of Sciences, Young Scientist Medal of the Indian National Science Academy, Krishnan Medal of the Indian Geophysical Union, National Geoscience Award of the Ministry of Mines and Physical Research Laboratory Research Award. The Council of Scientific and Industrial Research, the apex agency of the Government of India for scientific research, awarded him the Shanti Swarup Bhatnagar Prize for Science and Technology, one of the highest Indian science awards for his contributions to the Earth, Atmosphere, Ocean and Planetary Sciences in 2015.

Selected bibliography

Books and chapters 
 
 
Jyotiranjan S. Ray; M. Radhakrishna (28 February 2020). The Andaman Islands and Adjoining Offshore: Geology, Tectonics and Palaeoclimate. Springer, Cham. doi:10.1007/978-3-030-39843-9

Articles

Notes

References

External links 
 
 

Recipients of the Shanti Swarup Bhatnagar Award in Earth, Atmosphere, Ocean & Planetary Sciences
1970 births
Indian scientific authors
Indian geologists
Geochronology
Scientists from Odisha
Living people